The Lie is a 2011 American drama-comedy film, directed by Joshua Leonard, from a screenplay by Leonard, Jess Weixler, Mark Webber, and Jeff Feuerzeig. It is based upon a short story of the same name by T. Coraghessan Boyle, which was printed in The New Yorker. It stars Leonard, Weixler, Webber, Kelli Garner, Jane Adams, Alia Shawkat, Gerry Bednob, Holly Woodlawn, Kirk Baltz, Tipper Newton and Violet Long.

It had its world premiere at the Sundance Film Festival on January 25, 2011. It was released on November 18, 2011, by Screen Media Films.

Plot
A man's life is altered unexpectedly after telling a lie to get out of work.

Cast
 Joshua Leonard as Lonnie
 Jess Weixler as "Clover"
 Mark Webber as "Tank"
 Kelli Garner as Brianna
 Jane Adams as Dr. Bentel 
 Alia Shawkat as Seven
 Gerry Bednob as Radko
 Holly Woodlawn as "Cherry"
 Kirk Baltz as Joel
 Tipper Newton as Jeannie
 Violet Long as Xana
 James Ransone as "Weasel" 
 Matthew Newton as Steve 
 Allison Anders as Allison 
 Lola Blanc as Green-Eyed Girl 
 Michael McColl as Ted 
 Gwyn Fawcett as Mary 
 Germaine Mozel Sims as Diner

Production
Joshua Leonard had been on the lookout for a story to be made into a movie, when he read the short story, The Lie, which was in the April 14, 2008 issue of The New Yorker. He realized that the story was a good fit for an independent film that could be made in Los Angeles, using collaborators he already knew in the area. The original short story was sixteen pages long. The crew spent two and a half weeks shooting the film, and six months editing it.  For the baby Xana, the filmmakers cast Violet Long (an infant at that time) whose parents are Daniel (the film's co-producer) and Darby Long.

Release
The film had its world premiere at the Sundance Film Festival on January 25, 2011. Shortly after, Screen Media Films acquired distribution rights to the film. It was released on November 18, 2011.

Reviews

References

External links

2011 films
2011 comedy-drama films
American comedy-drama films
Films directed by Joshua Leonard
Films set in Los Angeles
Films shot in Los Angeles
2010s English-language films
2010s American films